Urban Development Authority (India) are statutory civic bodies created for the development of Infrastructure and Housing projects in planned way in cities of India. The foundation for current Indian Urban Development Authority is based on the structure designed during British Colonial Government era as a result of the Bombay plague in 1896. Urban Development Authority for each town is created as per the 74th amendment to the Constitution of India. The authority consists of planners and bureaucrats who are specialised in civic planning. The officials of the authority work with local State Governments in town planning activities.

History and Objective 

Urban Development Authority (India) consists of a group of non bureaucratic individuals and agencies who are responsible for planning Infrastructure development in Indian cities. The individuals are specialised in various aspects of town planning activities.

Activities 

Urban Development Authority planners are responsible for the following.

 Ensuring that Town planning schemes are implemented.
 Creating and implementing development plan of master plan for notified areas.
 Creation and implementation of urban area development initiatives like affordable housing,slum dwellers development.
 Implementation of Local Area Plan for the improvement of existing areas.
 Modernising building laws.
 Transit oriented development is promoted,
 Inclusion of conversion of heritage buildings in local area plans.
 Social and economic development planning.

Challenges 

The Urban Development Authority planners are faced with following challenges:

 Meeting housing needs of urban settlers.
 Investment on development initiatives.
 Resolving drinking water issues.
 Resolving sanitation issues.

List of Authorities 

Urban Development Authority are created for the following cities in India.

Andhra Pradesh

Arunachal Pradesh

Assam

Bihar

Chhattisgarh

Goa

Gujarat

Haryana

Himachal Pradesh

Jharkhand

Karnataka

Kerala

Madhya Pradesh

Maharashtra

Manipur

Meghalaya

Mizoram

Nagaland

Odisha

Punjab

Rajasthan

Sikkim

Tamil Nadu

Telangana

Tripura

Uttar Pradesh

Uttarakhand

West Bengal

Andaman and Nicobar Islands

Chandigarh

Delhi

Jammu and Kashmir

Ladakh

Lakshadweep

Puducherry

See also 

 Ahmedabad Urban Development Authority

References

External links 
 www.example.com

Urban development authorities
Urban development in India